Rhythm People (The Resurrection of Creative Black Civilization) is an album by the American saxophonist Steve Coleman, released in 1990. He is credited with his band, the Five Elements.

Production
Coleman wrote or cowrote all of Rhythm People (The Resurrection of Creative Black Civilization)'''s songs. David Gilmore played guitar on the album; Dave Holland played bass. Members of the M-Base music collective contributed, including Cassandra Wilson. Coleman rapped on "Dangerous".

Critical reception

Robert Christgau deemed the album "almost true fusion," but praised the "secondhand funk" aspects. The Chicago Tribune determined that "Coleman's alto sax is agile enough here; it just doesn't have any of the vitality of the [street] life with which it tries so hard to connect." The Los Angeles Times admired "Robin Eubanks' fat trombone doubling Coleman's elongated alto sax melody through 'Neutral Zone', and the slippery, peek-a-boo performance of 'Ice Moves'."

The St. Petersburg Times wrote: "Taking polyrhythmic cues from Africa, Coleman has derived a freewheeling funk beat that eschews taut 4/4 patterns." The New York Times'' concluded that "though the record has copious amounts of improvisation and complicated rhythmic and harmonic movement masquerading as funk, it is basically an instrumental pop record of great complexity." 

AllMusic wrote that Coleman's "solo style (often relying heavily on whole-tone runs and unexpected interval jumps) is intriguing."

Track listing

References

Steve Coleman albums
1990 albums
Novus Records albums